Middlesbrough by-election or similar terms may refer to:

 1878 Middlesbrough by-election
 1928 Middlesbrough West by-election
 1940 Middlesbrough West by-election
 1945 Middlesbrough West by-election
 1962 Middlesbrough East by-election
 1962 Middlesbrough West by-election
 2012 Middlesbrough by-election